Porco may refer to:

7231 Porco, an asteroid
Porco (caldera), in Bolivia
Porco Municipality, Antonio Quijarro Province, Bolivia
Porco Rosso, Japanese anime
Porco Galliard, a fictional character in the anime/manga series Attack on Titan

People with the surname
Carolyn Porco, planetary scientist
Christopher Porco, convicted for the murder of his father, attempted murder of his mother
Robert Porco
Linden Porco
Filippo Porco

See also
Dos Porcos River (disambiguation)